ABVA may stand for:

AIDS Bhedbhav Virodhi Andolan, an Indian AIDS and LGBT rights organization
General Union of Civil Servants (Algemene Bond van Ambtenaren, ABVA), a Dutch trade union, now Abvakabo